Betta chloropharynx is a species of gourami endemic to Bangka Island, Indonesia. It inhabits the leaf litter in a pool in a secondary forest.

References

chloropharynx
Freshwater fish of Indonesia
Taxa named by Maurice Kottelat
Taxa named by Ng Peter Kee Lin
Fish described in 1994
Taxonomy articles created by Polbot